Isaac Asimov's Robots in Time is a series of six science fiction novels featuring Isaac Asimov's Three Laws of Robotics. Written by American author William F. Wu as novels for children, they were the first series authorized to use Asimov's fictional universe after his death in 1992.

Plot outline
Set on Earth, it tells the story of the Governors, a series of state-of-the-art administrative robots. Each Governor is physically composed of six smaller units and is responsible for single-handedly directing the operations of a human-inhabited city. When the Governor robots begin to fail mysteriously, Mojave Center (MC) Governor acts to protect his own existence by separating into his components and traveling into the remote past to escape disassembly.

MC Governor is not aware, however, that the time travel method used alters its molecular structure, with the result that his components explode via nuclear blasts when they reach the moment in which they were originally altered. A team composed of three humans and one robot embarks on a series of missions to the past to retrieve the robots before they can alter history. Opposing their efforts are a renegade roboticist and his robot companion, who seek to track down the Governors in order to solve the problem of their mysterious failure before their team can.

Books in the series
Predator (1993) - A new robot named Hunter assembles a team of humans and journeys to the age of dinosaurs to find the first component robot, MC 1, before his actions in the late Cretaceous alter the course of Earth's zoology.
Marauder (1993) - Hunter pursues MC 2 to 17th-century Port Royal, Jamaica, in the time of privateers and buccaneers.
Warrior (1993) - Hunter and his team travel to Germany in the year 9 to stop MC 3 from interfering at the Battle of the Teutoburg Forest, a turning point in the history of the Roman Empire.
Dictator (1994) - Hunter tracks MC 4 in the World War II-era Soviet Union, shortly before the German army invades during the Battle of Moscow.
Emperor (1994) - MC 5 is followed to 13th-century China, where Hunter and his team meet the Manchu Emperor Kublai Khan and traveler Marco Polo.
Invader (1994) - In the final installment, the team travels to southern Britain to capture MC 6 in 459—in the time when a man named Artorius (King Arthur) led the Celts in war against the invading Saxons.

References
WilliamFWu.com - 'Robots in Time'

Isaac Asimov
Science fiction book series
Robots in literature